Holy Trinity Church is a church in the valley of Penrhos, Powys, Wales. The present church was built in 1845 to a design by Sydney Smirke, as a replacement for a previous church which was built in 1627. It was designated a Grade II-listed building on 29 December 1994.

References

External links
 

Penrhos